The kimpurushas are a race of beings featured in Hindu literature. They are described to possess the bodies of human beings and equine heads. They are associated and sometimes regarded to be the same as the kinnaras, though some Puranas offer them a distinction.  The kimpurushas are also described to be the attendants of the god of wealth, Kubera.

Literature

Bhagavata Purana 
Brahma is described to have created the kimpurushas and the kinnaras from his own reflected image.

The kimpurushas, along with a number of other beings, praise the glory of the Narasimha avatar of Vishnu after he slays Hiranyakashipu. 

The beings sing the praises of Mahabali for his selfless deed of offering the three worlds to the Vamana avatar of Vishnu.

Ramayana 
Budha transforms a number of women into kimpurushis (female kimpurushas) and instructs them to make a mountain their abode and take kimpurushas for their consorts.

Tirumurai 
The poet-saint Appar references the kimpurushas as one among the eighteen classes in his hymns.

See also 

 Kinnaras
 Yakshas
 Gandharvas

References 
Non-human races in Hindu mythology
Nature spirits
Types of deities

Hindu deities